Yerofeyev (masculine) or Yerofyeva (feminine), also transliterated as Erofeev or Erofeyev, is a Russian surname. It means "(someone) related to Yerofey", Yerofey (wikt:ru:Ерофей) being a form of the archaic Christian masculine first name Ierofey (Иерофей - from Greek Hierotheos (Ἱερόθεος)).

Notable people with the surname include:

Vasily Yerofeyev (1822–1884), Russian geologist
Mikhail Yerofeyev (1857–1941), Russian general
Oleg Yerofeyev (1940–2022), Russian admiral
Olga Erofeeva (born 1985), Russian triathlete]
Tamara Erofeyeva (born 1937), Russian linguist
Venedikt Yerofeyev (1938–1990), Russian writer
Victor Erofeyev (born 1947), Russian writer
Denis Erofeyev (born 1974), Russian racing driver
Vladimir Yerofeyev
 Vladimir Ivanovich Yerofeyev (1920-1991), Soviet diplomat
 Vladimir Yerofeyev (football coach)
  (1909—1986), Soviet ambassador

Russian-language surnames